Talegaun is a former village development committee in Jajarkot District in the Karnali Province of Nepal. At the time of the 1991 Nepal census it had a population of 2608.

References

External links
UN map of the municipalities of Jajarkot District

Populated places in Jajarkot District